Cheryl Ben Tov (Hebrew: שריל בנטוב), born Cheryl Hanin in 1960, is an American real estate agent and former Israeli Mossad agent who became well known in 1986 when, under the name "Cindy", she persuaded former Israeli nuclear technician Mordechai Vanunu to go with her to Rome, in the context of an Extraordinary rendition with the purpose of ultimately taking him to Israel. Vanunu faced a secret trial and was sentenced to 18 years in prison, spending nearly 12 of them in solitary confinement. Vanunu publicly released confidential information on Israel's nuclear reactor and stated that Israel had created nuclear weapons, becoming the sixth nuclear power and the first since the 1968 Treaty on the Non-Proliferation of Nuclear Weapons, of which Israel was not a signatory.

A feature in The Times revealed that Hanin was American-born but had moved to Israel as a teenager. Hanin grew up in Pennsylvania and Orlando, Florida in a Jewish family. Her father, Stanley Hanin, had founded Allied Discount Tires.

She spent a semester in Israel during high school at the Alexander Muss Institute for Israel Education in Hod Hasharon, and upon her graduation in 1978, joined the Israeli Army. In 1985, she married Ofer Ben Tov, himself an Israeli intelligence officer, and at some point before 1986 was recruited and trained by the Mossad. In 1986, she was one of the Mossad agents that  abducted  Mordechai Vanunu.

Calling herself Cheryl Hanin, she now works as a real estate agent in Northeast Orlando, Florida, with her husband and their two daughters. In 1988, newspaper journalists traced her to her home in Netanya, Israel, where she still owns a villa that she rents out. She does not deny her role in the "Cindy" affair. Vanunu, immediately upon his release from prison in April 2004, said that he did not believe "Cindy" was a Mossad agent: "She was either an FBI or a CIA agent. I spent a week with her. I saw her picture. Cindy was a young woman from Philadelphia." 

Regardless, it is clear that Cheryl Ben Tov was a Mossad agent.

Notes

External links 
 "The Spy -- And the Man She Busted" in The St. Petersburg Times
 "The History of the Honey Trap" in Foreign Policy

People of the Mossad
1960 births
Living people
American emigrants to Israel
20th-century American Jews
American real estate businesspeople
Businesspeople from Florida
Israeli Jews
People from Longwood, Florida
People from Orlando, Florida
21st-century American Jews